Jeffery M. Donohue (born June 26, 1954) is an American politician and a Democratic member of the Kentucky House of Representatives representing District 37 since January 8, 2013.

Education
Donohue graduated from Fairdale High School.

Elections
2012 Donohue challenged incumbent Representative Wade Hurt, who had switched parties, in the May 22, 2012 Democratic Primary, winning with 1,132 votes (63.4%) and was unopposed for the November 6, 2012 General election, winning with 7,864 votes.
2010 When District 37 Representative Ron Weston left the Legislature and left the seat open, Donohue was unopposed for seeking the Democratic nomination, but did not qualify; Republican nominee Wade Hurt was unopposed for the November 2, 2010 General election.

References

External links
Official page at the Kentucky General Assembly
Campaign site

Jeffery M. Donohue at Ballotpedia
Jeffery M. Donohue at OpenSecrets

Place of birth missing (living people)
1954 births
Living people
Democratic Party members of the Kentucky House of Representatives
Politicians from Louisville, Kentucky
Fairdale High School alumni
21st-century American politicians